Walter Lovett (born January 5, 1929) is a former American football player and coach. He served as the head football coach at Virginia State University from 1970 to 1972 and at Hampton University in Hampton, Virginia from 1974 to 1980, compiling a career college football coaching record of 56–48–1. Lovett was the line coach at Virginia State for five seasons prior to taking the head coaching position there.

Head coaching record

College

Notes

References

1929 births
Living people
American football quarterbacks
Virginia State Trojans football players
Virginia State Trojans football coaches
Hampton Pirates football coaches
High school football coaches in Virginia
People from Hampton, Virginia
Players of American football from Virginia